Ramón Porcel (11 December 1921 – 14 October 2003) was an Argentine rower. He competed in the men's coxed pair event at the 1948 Summer Olympics.

References

1921 births
2003 deaths
Argentine male rowers
Olympic rowers of Argentina
Rowers at the 1948 Summer Olympics
Rowers from Buenos Aires